Lanthanosuchidae is a family of procolophonomorph parareptiles that lived 268–255 million years ago. The group was named in 1946 by Ivan Antonovich Efremov.

References

Procolophonomorphs
Permian reptiles
Prehistoric reptile families